First Presbyterian Church is a historic church in Ellicott City, Howard County, Maryland adjacent to the Howard County Circuit Courthouse. The church is a cruciform shaped structure made of granite stone construction. The building was expanded and rebuilt after a basement collapse during construction in April 1894. The congregation relocated in 1960. Mrs. James A. Clark, Sr. purchased the church and donated it to the Howard County Historic Society.

See also
 List of Howard County properties in the Maryland Historical Trust

References

Howard County, Maryland landmarks
Houses in Howard County, Maryland
Churches in Ellicott City, Maryland